Charles Manly Stedman (January 29, 1841 – September 23, 1930) was a politician and lawyer from North Carolina.

Biography
Born in Pittsboro, North Carolina, Stedman moved to Fayetteville, North Carolina with his parents in 1853 where he attended Pittsboro and Donaldson Academies and graduated from the University of North Carolina at Chapel Hill in 1861, where he was a member of the Dialectic and Philanthropic Societies. During the Civil War he enlisted as a private in the Fayetteville Independent Light Infantry Company; part of the Confederate 1st North Carolina "Bethel Regiment. He later was promoted to major of the 44th North Carolina Infantry. Afterwards, Stedman returned to Chatham County, North Carolina and taught school in Pittsboro for one year. He studied law and was admitted to the bar in 1865, commencing practice in Wilmington, North Carolina.

Stedman first got involved in politics as a delegate to the 1880 Democratic National Convention, which nominated Winfield Scott Hancock and William Hayden English for President and Vice President of the United States. He was elected the fifth Lieutenant Governor of North Carolina in 1884, serving from 1885 to 1889, and unsuccessfully ran for the Democratic nomination for Governor of North Carolina in 1888. He moved to Asheville, North Carolina in 1891 and to Greensboro, North Carolina in 1898, continuing to practice law. Stedman served as a trustee of the University of North Carolina from 1899 to 1915, was president of the North Carolina Bar Association from 1900 to 1901, was again an unsuccessful candidate for Governor of North Carolina in 1903-04, and was director and president of the North Carolina Railroad from 1909 to 1910.

Stedman was elected a Democrat to the United States House of Representatives in 1910 and was reelected to the seat in 1912, 1914, 1916, 1918, 1920, 1922, 1924, 1926 and 1928, serving until his death in Washington, D.C. on September 23, 1930, the last veteran of the Civil War, either Union or Confederate Army, to serve in the U.S. Congress. He was interred in Cross Creek Cemetery in Fayetteville, North Carolina. A commemorative roadside sign was placed in Fayetteville in his honor.

In 1923 Stedman introduced a bill in the Senate to create a Mammy memorial in Washington. The bill passed in the Senate, but following a large amount of protest, died in the House.

See also
List of United States Congress members who died in office (1900–49)

References
 Retrieved on 2008-09-28
OurCampaigns.com
Charles Manly Stedman Papers, 1916-1919, in the Southern Historical Collection, UNC-Chapel Hill

Specific

External links
 
 

1841 births
1930 deaths
People from Pittsboro, North Carolina
Lieutenant Governors of North Carolina
North Carolina lawyers
20th-century American railroad executives
Confederate States Army officers
University of North Carolina at Chapel Hill alumni
Politicians from Fayetteville, North Carolina
Politicians from Wilmington, North Carolina
Politicians from Asheville, North Carolina
Politicians from Greensboro, North Carolina
People of North Carolina in the American Civil War
Democratic Party members of the United States House of Representatives from North Carolina